Damien Lagrange born 4 July 1987 in Bayonne, France, is a French professional rugby union player for SU Agen, having previously represented his hometown club after coming through their youth academy. Lagrange has become a regular in the SU Agen side over the last two seasons and is noted for his aggressive style of play.

References

1987 births
French rugby union players
Sportspeople from Bayonne
Living people
Rugby union locks